The 2017 USAC National Midget Series is the 62nd season of the USAC National Midget Series. The series began with the Shamrock Classic at Southern Illinois Center on March 18, and will end with the Turkey Night Grand Prix at Ventura Raceway on November 23. Tanner Thorson came into the season as the defending champion. Spencer Bayston won the series championship driving for Keith Kunz/Curb-Agajanian Motorsports in the #97 Bullet by Spike Chassis / Speedway Toyota.

Team and Driver Chart

Schedule
The entire season will be broadcast on-demand by Loudpedal.TV. Select races were broadcast live by Speed Shift TV.

 - * will state if the race is a non points event.
 - ≠ will state if the race was postponed or canceled

Schedule notes and changes
 - The May 19 race at Tri-City Speedway was canceled due to weather. No makeup date was scheduled.
 - The Jason Leffler Memorial at Wayne County Speedway was canceled due to weather. No makeup date was scheduled.

Results and Standings

Races

References

USAC National Midget Series
United States Auto Club